Aleck Winter "Alex" McAllister (1887–1956) was an American politician who holds the record as the longest-serving mayor of Huntsville, Alabama, having served for 26 years, from 1926 to 1952. He is buried at Maple Hill Cemetery in Huntsville.

References

Mayors of Huntsville, Alabama
1887 births
1956 deaths
20th-century American politicians